Sun4u may refer to

 Sun-4, an architecture used in workstations and servers
 Sun4U, a collapsed British holiday firm